Mark S. Webb (born September 10, 1998) is an American football safety for the Los Angeles Chargers of the National Football League (NFL). He played college football at Georgia.

Professional career
Webb was drafted by the Los Angeles Chargers in the seventh round, 241st overall, of the 2021 NFL Draft. On May 16, 2021, he signed his four-year rookie contract with Los Angeles. He was placed on injured reserve on November 26, 2021.

On August 30, 2022, Webb was waived by the Chargers and signed to the practice squad the next day. He signed a reserve/future contract on January 17, 2023.

References

External links
Los Angeles Chargers bio
Georgia Bulldogs bio

1998 births
Living people
Players of American football from Philadelphia
Georgia Bulldogs football players
Los Angeles Chargers players
American football safeties